Astyria, also Astyra (Ἀστυρα), was a coastal town of ancient Aeolis on the north shore of the Gulf of Adramyttium. 

It is tentatively placed near Kilisetepe, Asiatic Turkey.

References

Populated places in ancient Aeolis
Former populated places in Turkey
Ancient Greek archaeological sites in Turkey